Sun Modular Datacenter (Sun MD, known in the prototype phase as Project Blackbox) is a portable data center built into a standard 20-foot intermodal container (shipping container) manufactured and marketed by Sun Microsystems (acquired in 2010 by Oracle Corporation). An external chiller and power were required for the operation of a Sun MD. A data center of up to 280 servers could be rapidly deployed by shipping the container in a regular way to locations that might not be suitable for a building or another structure, and connecting it to the required infrastructure.  Sun  stated that the system could be made operational for 1% of the cost of building a traditional data center.

History 
The prototype was first announced as "Project Blackbox" in October 2006; the official product was announced in January 2008.

A Project Blackbox with 1088 Advanced Micro Devices Opteron processors ranked #412 on the June 2007 TOP500 list.

The Sun Modular Datacenter, aka: Project Blackbox, was a concept design between MIT alums, Greg Papadopoulos and Dave Douglas from Sun Labs and Danny Hillis from Applied Minds to determine what is the largest possible “thumb drive” that can still be easily transported worldwide by truck, rail, and air.  Their decision was a 20 foot standard shipping container would be ideal as transportation methods exist in near every country around the world.  Internally the 20 foot container was highly modified modified to hold 8ea 40RU compute racks of servers and/or storage.  Initial target audience was for secure portable DC and for disaster relief to allow internet access for email and insurance forms.

Prototype build occurred remotely at Applied Minds facility, managed by Adam Yates from Applied Minds and Russ Rinfret from Sun

The team behind Project Blackbox

Marketing

 Darlene Yaplee, Sr Director
 Michael Bohlig
 Cheryl Martin
 Bob Schiolmueller, Technical Marketing
 Joe Carvalho, Technical Marketing

Engineering

 Jud Cooley,  Sr Director for Project
 Chuck Perry,  Software and Environmental Systems Design
 Russ Rinfret,  Mechanical Engineering Manager
 Lee Follmer
 Tim Jolly
 Alex Barandian
 Chris Wooley
 Chris Spect
 Carl Meske

Supply and Vendor Mgmt

 Jeff Galloway

Customers 

On 14 July 2007, the SLAC National Accelerator Laboratory (SLAC) deployed a Sun MD containing 252 Sun Fire X2200 compute nodes as a compute farm. Other customers include Radboud University.

In March 2009, the Internet Archive migrated its digital archive into a Sun MD, hosted at Sun's Santa Clara headquarters campus, a realization of a paper written by Archive employees in late 2003 proposing "an outdoor petabyte JBOD NAS box" of sufficient capacity to store the then-current Archive in a 40' shipping container.

See also
 Google Modular Data Center

References

External links 

 Sun Modular Datacenter S20 Product Library Documentation
 Project Blackbox Blog
 

Sun Microsystems hardware
Intermodal containers
Data centers
Modular datacenter